Mayookha Johny (born 9 April 1988) is an Indian track and field athlete from Kerala who specialises in long jump and triple jump. She is the first Indian woman to cross the fourteen-metre mark.

Personal life
Mayookha was born on 9 August 1988, in Koorachund, Kozhikode, a district in Kerala state, India. Her father M. D. Johny was a bodybuilder and a former Mr. Bombay. Her current coach is Shyam Kumar.

Career
Performing for Kannur in the 50th Kerala State Athletic Championship at Thrissur, Mayookha won gold in long jump and triple jump (12.38  m) in under-20 category in 2006. In the triple jump event she beat the more experienced M.A. Prajusha and Tincy Mathew.

She finished seventh in the long jump at the 2010 Asian Games. Johny fared better at the 2011 National Games of India the following February, taking a long and triple jump double ahead of M. A. Prajusha.
Triple Jumper Mayookha Johny has become the first Indian woman to breach the 14-metre mark as she won a bronze medal in the third and final leg of the Asian Athletics Grand Prix in Wujiang, China.

At the Daegu 2011 World Championships in Athletics she qualified for the finals in the women's long jump event, thereby becoming only the third Indian ever to qualify for the final of an individual event in World Championships in Athletics. She finished 9th with a best jump of 6.37 meters, far behind her qualifying round performance where she recorded 6.53 meters.

In the 2012 Asian games, held at Hangzhou, China, Mayookha tried for olympic games qualification jump, but had to settle in with 6.44m. She needed another 0.21m to jump in the Olympics.

On 22 July 2012, Mayookha Johny triple jumped 13.91m to win the top place in a low-level meet in Dillingen, Germany. She competed at the 2012 Summer Olympics in the triple jump. She competed at the 2014 Commonwealth Games in the long jump.

References

External links
 

1988 births
Living people
People from Kozhikode district
Sportspeople from Kozhikode
Indian female long jumpers
Indian female triple jumpers
21st-century Indian women
21st-century Indian people
Olympic athletes of India
Athletes (track and field) at the 2012 Summer Olympics
Athletes (track and field) at the 2010 Asian Games
Athletes (track and field) at the 2014 Asian Games
Commonwealth Games competitors for India
Athletes (track and field) at the 2010 Commonwealth Games
Athletes (track and field) at the 2014 Commonwealth Games
World Athletics Championships athletes for India
Sportswomen from Kerala
Athletes from Kerala
Asian Games competitors for India
South Asian Games gold medalists for India
South Asian Games medalists in athletics